Efkarpia is a suburb of the Thessaloniki Urban Area and a former municipality in the regional unit of Thessaloniki, Greece. Since the 2011 local government reform it is part of the municipality Pavlos Melas, of which it is a municipal unit. Population 31.572 (2022). The municipal unit has an area of 13.263 km2.

References

Populated places in Thessaloniki (regional unit)